The Barbarians are Coming is a novel by David Wong Louie.

The novel tells the story of a Chinese American man trying to make it in the United States while dealing with his immigrant parents and their desires for their son.

The book was released in 2001 by Penguin, and received positive reviews from Publishers Weekly, The Los Angeles Times Book Review, San Francisco Chronicle, and Ploughshares.

Bibliography
The Barbarians Are Coming: A Novel, G.P. Putnam's Sons, 2000,

References

External links
The Barbarians Are Coming: A Reading by David Wong Louie, UCTV, 10/28/2002

2001 American novels
Chinese-American novels
Novels set in Long Island